Crystal Egger is an American former meteorologist with The Weather Channel and KNBC.

Early life and education 
Egger, a native of Grand Terrace, California, attended Terrace Hills Middle School and Colton High School.

Upon graduation, she attended the University of California, Santa Barbara where she received a B.A. in communications in 2000.  After UCSB, she attended Mississippi State University's meteorology program.

Career

Local beginnings 
Egger started her on-air work in San Diego, California, appearing on ITV Cable 16 in August 2004.  She moved to become the lead weather anchor on KIFI-TV in Idaho Falls, Idaho in 2006.  She subsequently moved to Denver, Colorado, where she served as KDVR's from 2007 through 2010.  While in Denver, she covered the 2008 Windsor, Colorado tornado.

The Weather Channel 
It was announced on September 1, 2010, that Egger had joined Atlanta-based The Weather Channel.  She remained with the organization for three years. She did segments for The Weather Channel while at KNBC.

Return home 
Egger returned to Southern California in September 2013 when she joined KNBC in Los Angeles, California. She left the role in 2017.

Personal life 
Egger has two daughters.

References

External links 
 NBC Los Angeles biography
 Agency biography

University of California, Santa Barbara alumni
American television meteorologists
The Weather Channel people
Living people
People from San Bernardino County, California
Year of birth missing (living people)